Dalton Clark Conley (born 1969) is an American sociologist. Conley is a professor at Princeton University and has written eight books, including a memoir and a sociology textbook.

Education 
Conley attended Stuyvesant High School. He subsequently graduated from the University of California, Berkeley with a B.A. in humanities and from Columbia University with an M.P.A. in public policy and a Ph.D. in sociology. He also holds an M.S. and Ph.D. in biology (genomics) from NYU.

Career
Conley is best known for his contributions to understanding how health and socioeconomic status are transmitted across generations. His first book, Being Black, Living in the Red (1999), focuses on the role of family wealth in perpetuating class advantages and racial inequalities in the post-Civil Rights era.

He has also studied the role of health in the status attainment process. An article, "Is Biology Destiny: Birth Weight and Life Chances" (with Neil G. Bennett, American Sociological Review 1999) and his second book, The Starting Gate: Birth Weight and Life Chances (with Kate Strully and Neil G. Bennett, 2003) addressed the importance of birth weight and prenatal health to later socioeconomic outcomes. Conley's next book, The Pecking Order, which followed in 2004, argued for the importance of within-family, ascriptive factors in determining sibling differences in socioeconomic success. Conley's subsequent book, Elsewhere, U.S.A., published in 2009, describes changes in American work-life attitudes and social ethics in the information economy. In 2014, he published the satirical book, Parentology: Everything You Wanted to Know About the Science of Raising Children but Were Too Exhausted to Ask, using his own parenting decisions as examples.

In 2017, Conley published The Genome Factor, co-authored with Jason Fletcher. This book discusses the nature versus nurture debate and the influence of genes on social life. Conley has also written an introductory sociology textbook, entitled You May Ask Yourself, currently in its 7th edition. He has also penned a memoir, Honky (2000) that examines Conley's own childhood growing up white in an inner-city neighborhood of housing projects of New York City.

Conley is the Henry Putnam University Professor of Sociology at Princeton University.] In 2018 he was elected to the National Academy of Sciences.

Personal life
Conley is married to the Bosnian-American astrophysicist Tea Temim with whom he has a child. He also has two children from a previous marriage: a daughter named E and a son named Yo Xing Heyno Augustus Eisner Alexander Weiser Knuckles Jeremijenko-Conley.

Works
 

, with Jason Fletcher

References

External links

 The Guardian profile of Honky

New York University faculty
Stuyvesant High School alumni
American sociologists
1969 births
Place of birth missing (living people)
Living people
University of California, Berkeley alumni
Members of the United States National Academy of Sciences